The Long Island Golf Association Amateur Championship, or simply the Long Island Amateur, has been held annually since 1922 in Long Island. The tournament is organized by the Long Island Golf Association and played on a rotating basis at member clubs.

Throughout its history, no one has dominated this Championship like Gene Francis. Beginning in 1962, he won seven times, finished second four times, and was the medalist on four occasions. In more recent years, George Zahringer, John Baldwin, Bob Murphy, Ken Bakst, and Joe Saladino have dominated the Amateur Championship.

Winners

Source:

References

Amateur golf tournaments in the United States
Golf in New York (state)